Abtsbessingen is a municipality in the district Kyffhäuserkreis, in Thuringia, Germany.

References

External links 
 

Municipalities in Thuringia
Kyffhäuserkreis
Schwarzburg-Sondershausen